This is a list of named geological features on Miranda.

Craters 

Mirandan craters are named after characters in Shakespeare's The Tempest.

This naming scheme results in many Mirandan craters sharing names with other Uranian moons: Ferdinand, Francisco, Prospero, Stephano, and Trinculo.

Coronae 

Mirandan coronae are named after the locations of plays by Shakespeare.

Regions 

Mirandan geological regions are called regiones. They are named after the locations of plays by Shakespeare.

Scarps 

Mirandan scarps are called rupes. They are named after the locations of plays by Shakespeare.

Sulci 

Mirandan sulci are named after the locations of plays by Shakespeare.

External links 

 USGS: Miranda nomenclature

Miranda (moon)
Miranda